Garrison Guitars was a guitar manufacturing company originally founded by Chris Griffiths in Canada in 1999. The company became a subsidiary of Gibson in 2007, and its plant was closed in 2010. During its existence, Garrison manufactured electric and acoustic guitars.

History 

Chris Griffiths established "Garrison Guitars" in St. John's, the capital city of the province of Newfoundland and Labrador, in 1999.

In early 2001, Garrison Guitars opened an acoustic guitar manufacturing company in Canada tooled with the latest robotics, laser cutting, CNC milling, and UV finishing. The 20,000 square foot factory produced orders for distribution in North America, Australia, United Kingdom, Norway, Germany, the Netherlands, Spain, China, Japan and Canada.

Garrison Guitars and its founder won awards for innovation, business planning, export growth, leadership and entrepreneurship. Garrison Guitars was awarded a "Golden Axe Award" for Best Value by Harmony Central in 2000. Founder Chris Griffiths was also awarded the Manning Innovation Award in 2003.

Garrison Guitars were crafted using innovations including the Griffiths Active Bracing System, a revolutionary method of guitar construction that took over six years to perfect. The single unit brace combined all the acoustic guitar's top braces into a single unit to allow for resonance to have an uninterrupted path of travel throughout the instrument and provided enhanced structural stability.

Offering a range of instruments at all price points, Garrison's "G"-Series featured all solid woods, hard-shell cases, bolt-on necks, and UV-finishes in a variety of wood combinations. The "G"-series also included the full GAB system combining front and back braces, kerfing, and neck and end blocks. The "G"-series were crafted in Canada. The "AG" Series was an affordable line using the patented bracing system technology only for the top, with more traditional back/side bracing and kerfing. The "AG" series were "designed in Canada, made in China".

The company also manufactured all solid wood mandolins and mandolas in its Canada factory.

On July 3, 2007, Gibson Guitar Corporation announced its acquisition of Garrison Guitars.
The acquisition was to "further Gibson's expansion in the acoustic guitar market offering a new series of Gibson brand acoustic guitars aimed at the median price point" and converted to produce the short-lived Gibson "Songmaker"-Series.

Gibson did not carry forward with the GABS in their Songmaker series, and ended production around 2010, closing down the Garrison factory in Canada, taking along with it the GABS technology.

References

Guitar manufacturing companies
Musical instrument manufacturing companies of Canada
Canadian companies disestablished in 2010
Canadian companies established in 1999
Companies based in St. John's, Newfoundland and Labrador
2007 mergers and acquisitions